Kaliema Antomarchi Ortega (born 25 April 1988) is a Cuban judoka.

She won a bronze medal at the 2017 World Judo Championships in Budapest.

She represented Cuba at the 2020 Summer Olympics. She competed in the women's 78 kg event.

References

External links
 

1988 births
Living people
Cuban female judoka
Judoka at the 2019 Pan American Games
Pan American Games medalists in judo
Pan American Games silver medalists for Cuba
Medalists at the 2019 Pan American Games
Judoka at the 2020 Summer Olympics
Olympic judoka of Cuba
Sportspeople from Santiago de Cuba
20th-century Cuban women
20th-century Cuban people
21st-century Cuban women